Camponotus cinctellus, commonly known as the shiny sugar ant, is a species of sugar ant with an extensive range in the eastern Afrotropics.

Description
The somewhat shimmering, golden-hued pubescence of the gaster is characteristic of all the worker castes. On the gaster, erect bristles are limited to the posterior segments. The reddish leg colour distinguishes it from the similar but smaller C. sericeus.

Range

It is native to eastern Africa from Eritrea to Kenya, Rwanda, the DRC, Tanzania, Mozambique, Zimbabwe and South Africa, as far south as coastal Transkei.

Subspecies
Two subspecies are recognized:
 C. c. cinctellus  – type locality in Mozambique
 C. c. belliceps Santschi, 1939 – type locality in the DRC

References

External links

cinctellus
Insects described in 1887
Hymenoptera of Africa